Polyozellus multiplex is a species of fungus first described in 1899, and is commonly known as the blue chanterelle, the clustered blue chanterelle, or, in Alaska, the black chanterelle. The distinctive fruit body of this species comprises blue- to purple-colored clusters of vase- or spoon-shaped caps with veiny wrinkles on the undersurface that run down the length of the stem. It was considered the monotypic species of Polyozellus until recent molecular work split the species complex into five species.  The genus name is derived from the Greek poly meaning many, and oz, meaning branch. The specific epithet multiplex means "in many pieces", referring to the compound nature of the fruit body.

P. multiplex may be found growing on the ground in coniferous forests, usually under spruce and fir trees. It is an edible species, and has been harvested for commercial purposes. P. multiplex contains the bioactive compound polyozellin, shown to have various physiological properties, including suppressive effects on stomach cancer.

Description 

Polyozellus multiplex is part of the group of fungi collectively known as cantharelloid mushrooms (which includes the genera Cantharellus, Craterellus, Gomphus, and Polyozellus) because of the similarity of their fruit body structures and the morphology of the spore-producing region (the hymenophore) on the underside of the caps.

The upper surface may be zonate—lined with what appear to be multiple concentric zones of texture caused by areas of fine hairs (a tomentum); and the edges of the caps have a layer of very fine hairs and are lobed and wavy. The underside of the caps bears the fertile, spore-making tissue called the hymenium, which typically has shallow, crowded wrinkles or veins that are roughly the same color or paler than the top surface. Some variation in color has been observed depending on the collection location. For example, specimens found in Alaska are more likely to be jet-black in color with a dark gray underside.

Occasionally, much larger clusters of fused mushrooms are found, up to a meter in diameter. The stem is dark purplish-black with a smooth (glabrous) and dry surface; the stems are often fused at the base. The flesh is dark violet, soft but breaking easily. The spore deposit is white.

Microscopic characteristics 

The spores are roughly spherical to broadly ellipsoid in shape, covered with small wart-like projections (tubercules), and have dimensions of 6–8.5 by 5.5–8 µm. Viewed microscopically, they are hyaline, meaning they appear translucent or colorless. Chemical tests may also be used to help distinguish the spores: in the presence of potassium hydroxide (KOH), the spores turn slightly green; the spores are not amyloid, meaning they do not take iodine when treated with Melzer's reagent; the spores are acyanophilous, meaning they do not readily absorb methyl blue stain. The cystidia that comprise the hymenium are filamentous and 3–4 µm wide by 28–40 µm long. The outer tissue layer of the cap—the cuticle, or pileipellis—is made of interwoven hyphae, and stains olive-green in KOH. Clamp connections are present, but not at all the cell partitions. The basidia, the spore-bearing cells, are 32–38 by 5–6 µm and four-spored.

Similar species 
The horn-of-plenty mushroom (Craterellus cornucopioides) also has a blackish fruit body and a smooth hymenium, but is distinguished from P. multiplex by its thin flesh, a trumpet- or tubular-shaped fruit body (rather than fan- or spoon-shaped), and grey to black colors. A closely related species, the fragrant chanterelle (Cantharellus odoratus),  also tends to grow in dense clusters, but it is orange rather than blue. Craterellus caeruleofuscus does not form compound clusters, and is not restricted to coniferous forests. The pig's ear Gomphus, species Gomphus clavatus, is similar in shape and form but fleshier, and light violet to pink.

Habitat and distribution 

Polyozellus multiplex is an ectomycorrhizal species, meaning that the hyphae of the fungus grow in a mutualistic association with the roots of plants, but the fungal hyphae generally do not penetrate the cells of the plant's roots. The species grows in coniferous woods under spruce and fir, and more frequently at higher elevations. It is most often encountered in summer and fall.

This species is northern and alpine in distribution, and rarely encountered. Collections have been made in the United States (including Maine, Oregon, Colorado, New Mexico, and Alaska), Canada (Quebec and British Columbia), China, Japan, and Korea. The disjunct distribution of this species in North America and East Asia has been noted to occur in a number of other fungal species as well. P. multiplex is also found in the Queen Charlotte Islands, where it is commercially harvested.

Uses

Edibility 
Polyozellus multiplex is edible, and is collected for sale in Asian countries such as Korea, Japan, and China. In North America, it is sometimes collected recreationally, and commercially. The taste is described as mild, and the odor as mild or aromatic. Mycologist David Arora claims the flavor to be inferior to Craterellus. It can be prepared by cooking. Fruit bodies may be preserved by drying.

Bioactive compounds 

The compound polyozellin—a chemical which can be isolated and purified from P. multiplex—inhibits prolyl endopeptidase (PEP), an enzyme that has a role in processing proteins (specifically, amyloid precursor protein) in Alzheimer's disease. Chemicals that inhibit PEP have attracted research interest due to their potential therapeutic effects. Further analyses of extracts from P. multiplex revealed similar dibenzofuranyl derivatives of polyozellin, each with different chemical properties, including kynapcin-12, kynapcin-13 and -28, and -24. A total synthesis of kynapcin-24 was achieved in 2009.

Antitumor properties 
Research conducted in 2003 suggests that extracts from P. multiplex may have suppressive effects on stomach cancer. The study showed that feeding a low concentration (0.5% or 1%) of the mushroom extract enhanced the activities of the enzymes glutathione S-transferase and superoxide dismutase, and increased the abundance of the molecule glutathione. The extract also augmented the expression of the protein p53. All of these substances protect the human organism against cancer. Additional studies reported in 2004 and 2006 attribute anti-tumor properties to polyozellin.

References

Thelephorales
Fungi described in 1899
Taxa named by Lucien Marcus Underwood